George Guthrie may refer to:

George H. Guthrie (born 1959), professor at Union University
George James Guthrie (1785–1856), English surgeon
George W. Guthrie (1848–1917), mayor
George Guthrie (athlete) (1904–1972), American track and field athlete
George Guthrie (songwriter) (1842–?), Newcastle upon Tyne songwriter

See also
 Guthrie (surname)
 Guthrie (disambiguation)